A hob is a type of small mythological household spirit found in the north and midlands of England, but especially on the Anglo-Scottish border, according to traditional folklore of those regions.  They could live inside the house or outdoors. They are said to work in farmyards and thus could be helpful; however, if offended they could become nuisances. The usual way to dispose of a hob was to give them a set of new clothing, the receiving of which would make the creature leave forever. It could, however, be impossible to get rid of the worst hobs.

Etymology

"Hob" is a diminutive form of the name "Robin", which is itself a diminutive form of the name "Robert". "Hob" is sometimes a generic term given to a goblin, bogle or brownie. The name "Hob" became associated with the mythical creature as "a piece of rude familiarity to cover up uncertainty or fear"; essentially, calling a mystical creature after a common nickname was a way to make the concept less frightening, and the nickname eventually became the common term.

Folklore
Hobs have been described as small, hairy, wizened men. Hobs were viewed as kind but mischievous spirits, helpful to local people in need. One famous hob lived near Runswick Bay in a hobhole; this hob was believed to be able to cure young children of kink-cough (whooping cough). Parents would bring their ailing young to the hob's cave dwelling and recite the following:"Hobhole Hob!
Ma' bairn's gotten 't kink cough,
Tak't off ! tak't off!"

Hobs are generally considered household spirits, who preferred to be about at night. Hobs were not tied to a particular place, but seemed to come and go as they chose. A hob would help the farmer in the field or the shopkeeper in his store. The householder had to be careful in dealing with a hob, so as not to offend it. If a farmer were to speak poorly of a hob on his farm, the hob might retaliate by breaking dishes and turning loose livestock. Most importantly, a hob must not be given a gift of clothing, as this would be greatly resented and might cause a helpful hob to leave immediately.  This was said to have happened at Sturfit Hall in Yorkshire, where the well-meaning family left a small hat and cloak for their helpful hob; however, when he encountered the gift, he exclaimed "Ha! a cap and a hood, / Hob'll never do mair good!" and was never seen again. Another Yorkshire hob, this one at Hart Hall, refused with a warning when offered a work shirt: "Gin Hob mun hae nowght but a hardin' hamp, / He'll come nae mair nowther to berry nor stamp."

Modern popular culture
The 1958 TV serial Quatermass and the Pit, and the later film version, centre around the fictional Hobbs Lane (formerly called Hob's Lane), the significance of the name becoming apparent as the plot unfolds. 
In Jim Butcher's The Dresden Files, hobs are eyeless creatures who burn in light. They serve the Queen Mab of the Winter Court of the Sidhe.
In the Lionhead Studios' video games Fable, Fable II, and Fable III some of the minor adversaries are creatures known as "hobbes". They are created from children who misbehave and are captured by hobbes.  
In J. K. Rowling's Harry Potter series, house-elves (such as Harry's friend Dobby) appear to be a type of hob, doing household tasks for human masters and driven from their households if given gifts of clothing (in what most house-elves see as a type of shameful expulsion, but the eccentric Dobby – and several human observers – consider an emancipation from slavery). 
 The Hob appearing in The Years of Longdirk by Ken Hood is considerably different from the traditional depiction, being a powerful spirit which is amoral, neither good nor bad, but which has considerable destructive powers it can use if provoked. In Hood's fantasy world, "Hob" and "Imp" are two names for much the same kind of being.
In The Hob's Bargain by Patricia Briggs, the Hob is a powerful creature, possibly the last of his kind, who bargains to help protect a local village from a necromancer in exchange for a mate. The heroine who brought the Hob to the village agrees to his bargain in exchange for his help. 
In Moonshine, the second novel of the Cal Leandros novels by Rob Thurman, the villain is "Hobgoblin" or "the Hob", the oldest of the race of immortal creatures known as pucks. In this series, the pucks all look alike, with curly brown hair, green eyes, and "foxlike" faces. Unlike his fellow puck, Robin Goodfellow, the Hob sees humans merely as toys and tools, beings which are utterly beneath him. 
In An Elder Scrolls Novel: The Infernal City, hobs are used as kitchen slaves.
In Richard Dawson's 2017 album Peasant, a song titled "Hob" tells the story of a family's encounter with a hobthrust.
In Travis Baldree's book Legends & Lattes, the main character hires a Hob as a carpenter in her coffee shop, noting that they are disparagingly referred to as 'Pucks' by humans and aren't often seen in cities.

See also
Hobbit
Hobgoblin
Lubber fiend, also known as "Lob".

References

Northumbrian folklore
Northumbrian folkloric beings
English folklore
English legendary creatures
Tutelary deities
Fairies
Elves
Household deities
Anglo-Scottish border
Goblins